Progress 29 was a Soviet uncrewed Progress cargo spacecraft, which was launched in April 1987 to resupply the Mir space station.

Launch
Progress 29 launched on 21 April 1987 from the Baikonur Cosmodrome in the Kazakh SSR. It used a Soyuz-U2 rocket.

Docking
Progress 29 docked with the aft port of the Kvant-1 module of Mir on 21 April 1987 at 15:14:17 UTC, and was undocked on 11 May 1987 at 03:10:01 UTC.

Decay
It remained in orbit until 11 May 1987, when it was deorbited. The deorbit burn occurred at 07:51:16 UTC and the mission ended at 08:28 UTC.

See also

 1987 in spaceflight
 List of Progress missions
 List of uncrewed spaceflights to Mir

References

Progress (spacecraft) missions
1987 in the Soviet Union
Spacecraft launched in 1987
Spacecraft which reentered in 1987
Spacecraft launched by Soyuz-U rockets